A team of five competitors listed as representing England competed at the 2022 European Championships in Munich, Germany, from 11–21 August 2022 in table tennis events. In all other sports, competitors from England competed as part of the Great Britain and Northern Ireland team.

Competitors
The following is the list of number of competitors in the Championships:

Table Tennis

Men
 Tom Jarvis
 Liam Pitchford
 Sam Walker

Women
 Charlotte Bardsley
 Tin-Tin Ho

Singles

Doubles

See also
Great Britain and Northern Ireland at the 2022 European Championships

References

2022
Nations at the 2022 European Championships
European Championships